Mylène Lamoureux (born October 31, 1986 in Laval, Quebec) is a Canadian ice dancer. With former partner Michael Mee, she was the 2006 Canadian national junior silver medalist. They placed 15th at the 2006 World Junior Figure Skating Championships and 10th in their senior Grand Prix debut at the 2006 NHK Trophy. Their partnership ended following the 2009 Canadian Figure Skating Championships.

Competitive highlights
(with Mee)

 N = Novice level; J = Junior level

External links
 Official site
 

1986 births
Canadian female ice dancers
Living people
Sportspeople from Laval, Quebec